Kurów Wielki is a village in the administrative district of Gmina Gaworzyce, within Polkowice County, Lower Silesian Voivodeship, in south-western Poland. It has a population of 50.

History
The oldest known mention of the village is from 1266. It was then part of the Duchy of Głogów within fragmented Piast-ruled Poland, and was owned by Jan of Kurów from the Kurowie noble family, a Polish knight in service of Konrad I, Duke of Głogów. In the 18th century the village was annexed by Prussia, and from 1871 to 1945 it was also part of Germany, before being reintegrated with Poland following Nazi Germany's defeat in World War II in 1945.

Sights
Among the notable monuments in Kurów Wielki are a Gothic parish church of Saint John the Baptist from the 14th century, and a tower in the same style. There are tombstones and epitaphs built into the church walls and the wall around the church and the cemetery. A presbytery from the late 18th century is located next to the church.

Notable residents
 Karl Arndt (1892–1981), German general

References

Villages in Polkowice County